Mishal Al-Ahmad Al-Jaber Al-Sabah (born 27 September 1940) is the Crown Prince of Kuwait.

Aged , he is the oldest crown prince in the world.

Biography
Mishal is a son of Kuwaiti Emir Ahmad Al-Jaber Al-Sabah, and paternal half-brother of Emir Nawaf Al-Ahmad Al-Jaber Al-Sabah. He studied at the Hendon Police College and graduated in 1960. He later served as the head of State Security from 1967 to 1980. Afterwards, he worked in the Ministry of Interior until he became the deputy chief of the National Guard with the rank of acting minister (by protocol designation) in 2004. He was nominated Crown Prince of Kuwait on 7 October 2020. On 8 October, he officially became the crown prince of Kuwait.

On 19 September 2022, Mishal attended the state funeral of Queen Elizabeth II at Westminster Abbey, London.

See also 
 List of current heirs apparent

References

External Links 

20th-century Kuwaiti people
1940 births
Crown princes
House of Al-Sabah
Kuwaiti Muslims
Living people
Heirs apparent
Sons of monarchs